Son of a Gun is a 2014 crime thriller film written and directed by Julius Avery. It stars Brenton Thwaites, Ewan McGregor, Alicia Vikander, and Jacek Koman.

Plot

A 19-year-old youth, JR (Brenton Thwaites) is sent to an Australian correctional facility for a minor crime. He finds his cellmate is being sexually abused by another group of prisoners led by a man named Dave. JR also meets the charismatic Brendan Lynch (Ewan McGregor), a notorious Scottish armed robber. Lynch is playing a game of correspondence chess when a passing JR points out an unseen checkmate against Lynch. Later, JR finds his cellmate sharpening a shiv with the intention of defending himself against Dave. When Dave and his gang move to attack the cellmate, JR prevents the attack by initiating a fight. Lynch scolds JR for meddling, and soon after, JR's cellmate is once again sexually assaulted. His cellmate attempts to commit suicide and he is hospitalized, causing Dave to focus his sexual attacks on JR. When Dave and his gang try to rape JR, Lynch and his men, Sterlo (Matt Nable) and Merv (Eddie Baroo), rescue JR and kill Dave. In exchange for Lynch's protection during JR's sentence, JR agrees to perform tasks for Lynch once he gets out of prison.
 
Upon release six months later, JR meets crime lord Sam (Jacek Koman), with whom Lynch is playing chess, and his nephew Josh (Tom Budge). JR is given an apartment and a briefcase of Lynch's personal effects, including fake passports, clothes, and a pistol.  A young woman named Tasha (Alicia Vikander) then arrives at the apartment to give JR cash and a cellphone. Following instructions given, JR visits Private Wilson (Damon Herriman) and illegally purchases high-powered firearms. JR then hijacks a helicopter used for scenic tours, and forces the pilot at gunpoint to fly to prison to extract Lynch and his gang under heavy gunfire.  They continue their escape in a car, and while stopped at a convenience store where Merv buys food, the other three discover from a radio broadcast that Merv lied about being incarcerated for GBH but actually raping a Perth schoolgirl. Lynch then brutally beats Merv and expels him from the gang.
 
The three head to Sam's estate, where he recruits Lynch and his men to execute a gold heist at Kalgoorlie, where the expected payout is in the millions. Afterwards, a party occurs at the estate, and JR spots Tasha, whom he follows to the poolside. Before long, Josh decides to harass JR and pushes him into the pool. JR, unable to swim, is rescued by Tasha, and the two leave the party to eat at a Chinese restaurant. Here, Tasha reveals her previous relationship with Sam, and how people who run from him are killed.
 
The next morning, Lynch warns JR to stay focused on the task at hand and not be distracted by Tasha. They then visit the quarry they plan to rob. Lynch tells JR that his role in the heist will be to access the room with the gold and ensure that no quarry employees press the panic button. Lynch then goes and recruits a rally racer named Chris (Nash Edgerton) to be the getaway driver. Back at Sam's estate, the gang plan the heist, and a fight breaks out between JR and Josh. The fight is broken up and Lynch tells JR to go calm down. JR heads to the bar where he sees Tasha, and scares away some men who are harassing her. Angry with his impulsiveness in scaring away the men, given that she does not have proper immigration papers, Tasha tells JR that he was being stupid, but when JR asks her to have coffee, she asks him to meet her near his house. Later that night, JR sneaks out to meet Tasha and goes into the water after her where the two have sex.
 
The next day, the group goes ahead with the heist. The group infiltrates the quarry and inserts JR into the ventilation shaft above the gold room. When the time comes, JR successfully intimidates the gold room employees into not pressing the panic button, and lets the rest of the crew in. Lynch then takes two employees to pour the melted gold into bars, but he decides against the plan and asks Josh to guard the employees while JR watches the gold pouring. This infuriates Josh who ends up shooting an employee in the leg. Lynch breaks Josh's nose with the stock of a shotgun and returns to watching the gold being poured. Police arrive, and the crew walks into the open disguised as employees, but holding the real employees at gunpoint. Then, Lynch releases the hostages and opens fire on the police vehicles and personnel. Chris arrives with the getaway vehicle, but on their way out, Sterlo is shot through the abdomen and begins bleeding heavily. Chris manages to incapacitate the two chasing police vehicles and escape, but Sterlo dies at the end of the chase, instructing Lynch to give his cut of the heist to his wife.
 
Sam betrays Lynch, JR, and Tasha, but the three escape safely and travel to Melbourne where Sam plans to meet his fence. JR and Lynch sabotage the rendezvous, killing Sam's henchman and kidnapping Josh in the process. After interrogating Josh, they find the gold stashed in a storage unit.
 
Lynch and JR kill Sam in his estate. Before JR and Lynch escape for good, Lynch offers him $350,000 to leave. Here it is revealed that when JR realized Lynch would discard him once he had acquired the gold, JR masterminded a plan to steal the gold with Tasha and take half. Lynch has no choice but to accept JR's terms and wait. Before he receives the gold, however, a woman in a laundromat identifies him as the escaped convict, and Lynch is sent back to jail. Later JR sends Lynch a postcard detailing where the gold has been left for him, and a picture of a pregnant Tasha, hinting at an optimistic future.

Cast
 Ewan McGregor as Brendan Lynch
 Brenton Thwaites as Jesse Ryan "JR" White 
 Alicia Vikander as Tasha
 Jacek Koman as Sam Lennox
 Matthew Nable as Sterlo
 Tom Budge as Josh
 Nash Edgerton as Chris
 Damon Herriman as Wilson

Production
Principal photography took place in late February 2013 in Perth, Kalgoorlie, and Melbourne, Australia.

Release
In May 2014, A24 and DirecTV Cinema acquired U.S distribution rights to the film. 
The film had premiered at the CinefestOZ Film Festival on 20 August 2014. The film screened at the London Film Festival on 17 October 2014.

The film opened in Australia on 16 October 2014. and was released on DirecTV Cinema on 11 December 2014, before being released in a limited release and through video on demand on 16 January 2015.

Reception
Son of a Gun received mixed reviews from critics. It currently has a Rotten Tomatoes rating of 62% based on 76 reviews, with an average score of 5.7/10 and the consensus: "Gritty, stylish, and smart, Son of a Gun serves up plenty of genre thrills and offers a new change of pace from Ewan McGregor." On Metacritic, the film has a 49/100 rating based on 20 critics, indicating "mixed or average reviews".

References

External links
 
 
 

2014 films
2014 action thriller films
2014 crime drama films
2014 crime thriller films
Australian action thriller films
Australian crime thriller films
Australian thriller drama films
Films directed by Julius Avery
English-language Canadian films
Films set in Western Australia
Films shot in Melbourne
Australian independent films
2010s prison films
Australian heist films
A24 (company) films
Australian action adventure films
Australian crime drama films
2014 independent films
2014 directorial debut films
Films scored by Jed Kurzel
2010s English-language films
2010s Canadian films
Canadian crime thriller films
Canadian action adventure films
Canadian crime drama films
Canadian action thriller films
Canadian heist films
2010s American films